Tower Municipal Airport  is a city-owned public-use airport located one nautical mile (2 km) northwest of the central business district of Tower, a city in Saint Louis County, Minnesota, United States. It is located on Lake Vermilion and is also known as Tower Municipal Airport & Seaplane Base.

Facilities and aircraft 
It has two runways designated 8/26 with a 3,400 x 75 ft (1,036 x 23 m) asphalt surface. It also has one seaplane runway landing area designated 14W/32W which measures 5,000 x 200 ft (1,524 x 61 m).

For the 12-month period ending April 30, 2007, the airport had 3,700 general aviation aircraft operations, an average of 10 per day. In March 2017, there were 15 aircraft based at this airport: 14 single-engine and 1 ultralight.

References

External links 

Airports in Minnesota
Seaplane bases in the United States
Buildings and structures in St. Louis County, Minnesota
Transportation in St. Louis County, Minnesota